Martin Robert Turner (born 1 October 1947) is an English musician best known for his time as the bass guitarist, lead vocalist and a founding member of the rock band, Wishbone Ash.

Career

Turner was with Wishbone Ash, known for their twin lead guitars, melodic songwriting and complex instrumental style, from its inception in 1969 until 1980, during which time he was a key songwriter and creative force within the band. He played on their classic album Argus to which he also contributed vocals as well the bulk of the album's lyrics. Turner's melodic basslines, where the instrument was often used as a third lead guitar, were an important part of the Wishbone Ash sound during the 1970s.

In 1980, a decision by the rest of Wishbone Ash to introduce a frontman led to Turner parting company with Wishbone Ash. The frontman never appeared and Turner was replaced by John Wetton, who was formerly with King Crimson, Uriah Heep, Family and Roxy Music. Turner went on to a career in studio management and record production and also formed his own band The Wolfgang (also known as Bamboo and Martin Turner's Stolen Face). The Wolfgang recorded new material, although this was not released until 1996, when it appeared on Turner's solo album, Walking The Reeperbahn.

In 1987 the original quartet reformed, and Turner produced and performed on the albums Nouveau Calls, Here to Hear and Strange Affair as well as undertaking worldwide touring with the band between 1988–1991. In late 1991 Wishbone Ash decided to continue without Turner.  He has, however, appeared with Wishbone Ash on several occasions since, most notably the band's 25th anniversary celebrations in 1995/96, as well as being involved in the mixing and remastering of several back catalogue, compilation and archival Wishbone Ash CD titles.

In 1996, Turner released Walking the Reeperbahn, featuring material spanning the years 1981–1996.

In 2005, he formed a new band, Martin Turner's Wishbone Ash to perform music from the definitive era of Wishbone Ash. The band's first line-up included guitarists Ray Hatfield and Keith Buck plus drummer Rob Hewins. Their debut release, entitled New Live Dates Vol.1 was released in 2006, followed by New Live Dates Vol. 2 in 2007. Both featured a guest appearance by original Wishbone Ash member Ted Turner.

Martin Turner's Wishbone Ash have since released Argus: Through The Looking Glass, a 2008 re-recording of Wishbone Ash's seminal album, and Life Begins Tour a 2CD/DVD recording of a performance at Leicester Y Theatre in March 2010.

In July 2012 Martin Turner published his autobiography No Easy Road – My Life and Times With Wishbone Ash and Beyond through his website. The book chronicles the classic Wishbone Ash years, as well as Turner's personal journey, and contained contributions from former Wishbone Ash members Ted Turner (who also wrote the foreword to the book), Laurie Wisefield and Ray Weston, as well as other key figures in the story.

Following court action pursued by Andy Powell to prevent Martin Turner using the name "Martin Turner's Wishbone Ash", in 2014 Martin Turner's touring activities were re-branded as "Martin Turner plays the music of Wishbone Ash". This was later changed to "Martin Turner Ex Wishbone Ash".

In 2008 Danny Willson joined on guitar replacing Keith Buck.
In 2013 Tim Brown joined on drums and stayed with the band until June 2022.
In 2015 Misha Nikolic joined on guitar replacing Ray Hatfield.

In 2015, Martin Turner produced a new album, Written In The Stars. The sound is reminiscent of the classic Wishbone Ash sound from the 1970s, and has received mostly favourable reviews. The album won the "Album of the Year 2015" award in the What's On magazine 2015 awards.

In 2022 Martin Turner is still touring and performing classic Wishbone Ash songs from the back catalogue under the name "Martin Turner Ex Wishbone Ash" and continues to have a loyal fan base. They regularly sell out Theatre venues in the U.K. and regularly tour Europe.
The current personnel consists of Danny Willson on guitar (former member of Showaddywaddy) Misha Nikolic on guitar and drummer Sonny Flint who joined in June 2022.

Instruments
Turner was known for playing a Jetglo Rickenbacker 4001 bass guitar during Wishbone Ash's most successful spell in the 1970s. The tone obtained from his set-up was an integral part of the band's early sound. Martin now regularly performs playing a white Gibson Thunderbird bass guitar, which he bought from Peter Overend Watts of Mott the Hoople.

Solo discography

Studio albums:
Walking the Reeperbahn (1996)
Track Listing (all songs by Martin Turner except as shown) -
 "Fire Sign" 
 "Walking the Reeperbahn"
 "Hot Surrender"
 "My Brother"
 "Strangers" (Turner, Price-Davies)
 "Psychic Flash to Ginza"
 "You"
 "Passion"
 "Lean on Me" (Bill Withers)
 "Kelly's Away With the Fairies"
 "Where Will I Go?"
 "The Naked Truth"
 "Heaven Is"
 "Broken Down House"

 Argus Through the Looking Glass (2008)
Track Listing:
All compositions written by Martin Turner, Steve Upton, Ted Turner and Andy Powell

 "Time Was"
 "Sometime World"
 "The King Will Come"
 "Leaf and Stream"
 "Warrior"
 "Throw Down the Sword"
 "Blowin' Free"

Personnel

Martin Turner – bass guitar, lead vocals
Ray Hatfield – acoustic and lead guitars, vocals
Danny Willson – lead guitar, vocals
Keith Buck – lead guitar, vocals
Rob Hewins – drums, percussion, vocals
with special guests

John Wetton – harmony vocals
Geoff Downes – Hammond organ

 Written in the Stars (2015) as 'Martin Turner, founding original member of Wishbone Ash'

Track Listing:

 "The Big Bang (Overture)" (Turner, Ray Hatfield) – 1.20
 "The Beauty of Chaos" (Turner) – 3.40
 "Written in the Stars" (Turner) – 4.25
 "Lovers" (Turner, N Greenway) – 4.30
 "Vapour Trail" (Danny Willson, Turner, Tim Brown, Ray Hatfield, E Burns) – 5.50
 "The Lonely Star" (Danny Willson, Turner) – 4.05
 "For My Lady" (Turner, R Lynton) – 4.15
 "Pretty Little Girls" (Turner) – 4.55
 "Falling Sands" (Ray Hatfield, Turner, Tim Brown, Danny Willson) – 6.00
 "Mystify Me" (Ray Hatfield) – 5.20
 "Interstellar Rockstar" (M Emery, Ivan Jewel, Turner) – 7.00

Personnel:

Martin Turner – bass guitar, lead vocals
Danny Willson – guitars, harmony vocals
Misha Nikolic – guitars, classical guitar
Tim Brown – drums, harmony vocals
with sincere thanks to Ray Hatfield for guitars and harmony vocals throughout this album

Additional musicians on track 11:

Ivan Jewel – orchestral and choir arrangement
Jennifer Rhys-Williams, Ivan Jewel – choir vocals
Harriet James – recorders
Ree De Lacey – ad-lib female vocals
Spoken words on track 6 by Austin Willson

Live-recordings:
New Live Dates Volume 1 (2006)
New Live Dates Volume 2 (2007)
Life begins 2CD (2011)
The Garden Party - A Celebration of Wishbone Ash Music 2CD (2014)
Recorded live at Liscombe Park Buckinghamshire, 31 August 2012
 Martin Turner - bass, lead vocals
 Danny Wilson - guitars, vocals
 Ray Hatfield - guitars, vocals
 Dave Wagstaffe - drums
with
 Ted Turner - guitars and vocals on tracks 11 to 17
 Laurie Wisefield - guitars on tracks 16 to 17

Track Listing
	"Standing in the Rain"	
	"Rest in Peace"
	"Haunting Me"	
	"Lady Jay"	
	"Fire Sign"	
	"The Pilgrim"	
	"Way of the World"	
	"No Easy Road"	
       "Doctor"	
	"Broken Down House"	
	"Valediction"	
	"The King Will Come"	
	"Prelude"	
	"In the Skin"	
	"Why Don't We"	
	"Living Proof"	
	"Jailbait"

The Beauty of Chaos (2018)
Track listing
 Intro:
 "The Big Bang (Overture)"
 "The Beauty of Chaos"
 "Written in the Stars"
 "Lovers"
 "Vapour Trail"
 "The Lonely Star"
 "For My Lady"
 "Falling Sands"
 "Pretty Little Girls"
 "Mystify Me"
 "Interstellar Rockstar"
 "The Pilgrim"
 "Lady Jay"
 "Blind Eye"
 "The King Will Come"
 "Warrior"
 "Throw Down the Sword"
 "Sometime World"
 "FUBB"
 "You See Red"
 "Living Proof"
 "Blowing Free"
 "Doctor"
 "Jailbait"

DVDs
 The Life Begins Tour (Live in Leicester 2010) (2011)

References

External links
Martin Turner's official site
Historical information on the classic line-ups of Wishbone Ash
Gibsonbass.com

1947 births
Living people
musicians from Torquay
English rock bass guitarists
Male bass guitarists
English male singers
English rock singers
English songwriters
Wishbone Ash members
British male songwriters